Suidasiidae is a family of mites belonging to the order Sarcoptiformes.

Genera:
 Aphelinia
 Donnadieuia Zachvatkin, 1941
 Lemanniella Mahunka, 1977
 Namibacarus Fain, Coineau & André, 1993
 Sapracarus Fain & Philips, 1978
 Suidasia Oudemans, 1904
 Tortonia Oudemans, 1911

References 

Sarcoptiformes
Acari families